The 2008 Ondrej Nepela Memorial was the 16th edition of an annual senior-level international figure skating competition held in Bratislava, Slovakia. The competition was held between November 22 and 23, 2008 at the Ondrej Nepela Ice Rink. Skaters competed in the disciplines of men's singles, ladies' singles, and ice dancing. The compulsory dance was the Paso Doble.

Results

Men

Ladies

Ice dancing

External links
 Ondrej Nepela Memorial

Ondrej Nepela Memorial
Ondrej Nepela Memorial
Ondrej Nepela Memorial